Maghama is a department of Gorgol Region in Mauritania.

List of municipalities in the department 
The Maghama department is made up of following municipalities:

 Beileguet Litama
 Daw
 Dolol Cive
 Maghama
 Sagne
 Toutel
 Vrea Litama
 Waly Diantang.

In 2000, the entire population of the Maghama Department has a total of 45 501 inhabitants  (21 999 men and 23 502 women).

References 

Departments of Mauritania